Kenneth Wilson (born November 30, 1938) is an American sprint canoer who competed in the late 1950s and early 1960s. Competing two Summer Olympics, he earned his best finish of 12th in the K-2 10000 m event at Melbourne in 1956.

References
Sports-reference.com profile

1938 births
American male canoeists
Canoeists at the 1956 Summer Olympics
Canoeists at the 1960 Summer Olympics
Living people
Olympic canoeists of the United States